Ptolemy-el-Garib (Arabic, more correctly al-gharīb, "Ptolemy the foreigner," explained as meaning "Ptolemy the unknown") (fl. c. 300 AD) was a Hellenistic pinacographer, probably of the Peripatetic school, who wrote a Life of Aristotle notable for its catalog of Aristotle's works.  This work survives in an Arabic manuscript in Istanbul. A critical edition, with French translation was published by Marwan Rashed.

Historical context
The excerpts known prior to this discovery were collected in Ingemar Düring's Aristotle in the Ancient Biographical Tradition (Göteborg 1957), pp. 221–231.

Marian Plezia has cast doubt on the idea that Ptolemy-el-Garib's Life was an important source of later Neoplatonic lives of Aristotle.

Notes

References
Hans Gottschalk, "The Earliest Aristotelian Commentators," in Aristotle Transformed (ed. Richard Sorabji, 1990), pp. 56f. n. 5.

Further reading
Ingemar Düring, "Ptolemy's Vita Aristotelis rediscovered," in Philomathes: studies and essays in the humanities in memory of Philip Merlan, ed. Robert B. Palmer and Robert Hamerton-Kelly (The Hague: Nijhoff, 1971), pp. 264-269 - includes an English translation of Ptolemy's preface.
Dimitri Gutas, "The spurious and the authentic in the Arabic Lives of Aristotle," in Pseudo-Aristotle in the Middle Ages: the Theology and other texts. Edited by Ryan William Francis, Kraye Jill, and Schmitt Charles Bernard. London: Warburg Institute. University of London 1986. pp. 15-36 (Reprinted as Chapter VI in D. Gutas, Greek philosophers in the Arabic tradition, Aldershot, Ashgate, 2000).
Marian Plezia, "De Ptolemaeo pinacographo," Eos 63 (1975), pp. 37–42.
——, "De Ptolemaei Vita Aristotelis," in Aristoteles: Werk und Wirkung, vol. 1 (Aristoteles und seine Schule), ed. Jürgen Wiesner (Berlin: de Gruyter, 1985), pp. 1-11.

External links
 The Ancient Catalogues of Aristotle's Writings: Hesychius and Ptolemy al-Garib. A Survey of Current Research
 Bibliography on the Ancient Catalogues of Aristotle's Writings contains a list of studies on Ptolemy-el-Garib

Ancient Greeks
Peripatetic philosophers
Works about Aristotle